The 1969 Southeast Asian Peninsular Games, officially known as the 5th Southeast Asian Peninsular Games, was a Southeast Asian multi-sport event held in Rangoon, Burma from 6 to 13 December 1969 with 15 sports featured in the games. Republic of Vietnam (South Vietnam) had reluctantly declined to host this edition because the attack of the North Vietnam (Tet Offensive) in 1968 (Vietnam War). Singapore, the youngest member of the SEAP Games Federation at the time, suggested in this edition of the games to change the name of the sports festival to the Southeast Asia Games. Although it was not officially stated, the inclusion of the Philippines and Indonesia in the expanded federation was to greatly help alleviate the hosting problems, as well as to set higher and more competitive standards in the games. After hosting the 5th edition, Burma declined hosting succeeding games due to lack of financial capability. This was Burma's second time to host the games and its first time since 1961. The games was opened and closed by Ne Win, the Prime Minister and Chairman of Union Revolutionary Council of Burma at the Bogyoke Aung San Stadium. The final medal tally was led by host Burma, followed by Thailand and Singapore.

The games

Participating nations

  (host)

Sports

Medal table

Key
 Host nation (Burma)

References

External links
 History of the SEA Games
 Medal Tally 1959-1995
 Medal Tally
 OCA SEA Games
 SEA Games previous medal table
 SEAGF Office  
 SEA Games members

 
Southeast Asian Games
Southeast Asian Peninsular Games
Southeast Asian Peninsular Games, 1969
S
Multi-sport events in Myanmar
Southeast Asian Peninsular Games
Sport in Yangon
20th century in Yangon